Buku Harian Nayla (Nayla's Diary) is an Indonesian Christmas television drama that aired on RCTI, written by Serena Luna. The show told the story of a girl diagnosed with ataxia when she was young. Due to overwhelming response from fans, re-runs were shown on RCTI at 4.30pm every Monday and Friday, with its running time shortened to 30 minutes including commercials due to lack of scheduling room. A second season, titled Buku Harian Nayla: 8 Tahun Kemudian (Nayla's Diary: 8 Years Later) was released on April 13, 2015.

Synopsis

Nayla (Chelsea Olivia) is a bright, cheerful and hard-working student, the leader of her class and a talented basketball player, also very devoted to her religion. However, she is unknowingly afflicted with ataxia, which would eventually paralyze her. Her doctor, Dr Fritz, suggests that she write a diary so he can monitor her symptoms. After her diagnosis the doctor is initially reluctant to inform her of the grave nature of her condition, but does as her condition worsens.

The show follows her as she deals with the difficulties arising from her condition and her problems at school, and in her relationship with her classmates and her boyfriend Moses (Glenn Alinskie). As her classmates start to think about their future and their studies, she focuses on her writing, even when her condition becomes life-threatening. In the end her writing is depicted as having the ability to bring strength to those around her.

Cast
Chelsea Olivia Wijaya as Nayla 
Glenn Alinskie as Moses
Andrew White as Paul
Steve Emmanuel as Dr. Fritz
Moudy Wihelmina as Martha
Yadi Timo as Aldhi
Rudy Salam as Dr. Gerdy
Debby Chintya as Mrs. Gerdy
Raka Hafid as Irvan
Virgo Brodin as Gio 
Gisela Cindy as Joana (Aso Kito in Japan)
Maya Sheila as Sela
Lita Ramadhanty as Hias

Criticism and controversy
The drama was accused of plagiarizing Japanese television drama 1 Litre of Tears. The name "Aya" was replaced with "Nayla", and the name "Asō" replaced by "Moses". Until now, there has still been no resolution nor any effort to enforce copyright law for this case.

The accusation that this series plagiarizes 1 Litre of Tears was accepted by the main actor, during an interview with Bintang Indonesia.

The series itself did not include any note that the show was "inspired by" or "adapted from" another, instead claiming that the story was merely a fiction.

References

Indonesian drama television series
RCTI original programming
Television series about Christianity
2006 Indonesian television series debuts
2006 Indonesian television series endings